Ardeinae is a subfamily of herons, which includes the day herons, night herons, and egrets.

Taxonomy 
 Genus Zeltornis (fossil, Early Miocene of Djebel Zelten, Libya)
 Genus Nycticorax – typical night herons (two  living species, four recently extinct; sometimes includes Nyctanassa)
 Genus Nyctanassa – American night herons (one living species, one recently extinct)
 Genus Gorsachius – Asian and African night herons (four species)
 Genus Butorides – green-backed herons (three species; sometimes included in Ardea)
 Genus Agamia – Agami heron
 Genus Pilherodius – capped heron
 Genus Ardeola – pond herons (six species)
 Genus Bubulcus – cattle egrets (one or two species, sometimes included in Ardea)
 Genus Proardea (fossil)
 Genus Ardea – typical herons (11–17 species)
 Genus Syrigma – whistling heron
 Genus Egretta – typical egrets (7–13 species)
 Genus undetermined
 Easter Island heron, Ardeidae gen. et sp. indet. (prehistoric)

References